The 1936 United States Senate election in Oklahoma took place on November 3, 1936. Incumbent Democratic Senator Thomas Gore ran for re-election to his second consecutive term, and fifth term overall. He ended up easily losing renomination, however; he placed a distant fourth in the Democratic primary. A runoff election between Congressman Joshua B. Lee and Governor Ernest W. Marland resulted in a landslide win for Lee. In the general election, Lee faced Republican nominee Herbert K. Hyde, whom he overwhelmingly defeated.

Democratic primary

Candidates
 Joshua B. Lee, U.S. Congressman from Oklahoma's 5th congressional district
 E. W. Marland, Governor of Oklahoma
 Gomer Smith, attorney 
 Thomas Gore, incumbent U.S. Senator
 Herndon J. Thompson
 J. L. Barnard
 Charles T. Kirtley
 Daniel O. Witmer

Results

Runoff election results

Republican primary

Candidates
 Herbert K. Hyde, former U.S. Attorney
 Horace G. McKeever, Enid attorney
 Robert W. Kellough
 Frank A. Anderson
 Remington Rogers
 Ed Arnold
 Amos Wilson
 Orlando Swain

Results

Though a runoff election was scheduled between Hyde and McKeever, McKeever withdrew from the race on July 13, 1936, ceding the nomination to Hyde.

Runoff election results

General election

Results

References

Oklahoma
1936
1936 Oklahoma elections